American Gangster is a documentary television series, which airs on BET. The show features some of black America's most infamous and powerful gangsters and is narrated by Ving Rhames. The series premiere, on November 28, 2006, amassed around one million viewers. The first season ended on January 9, 2007, and comprised 6 episodes; a season 1 DVD was released on October 23, 2007. The second season aired October 3, 2007; a season 2 DVD was released on June 10, 2008. In April 2009, A&E Networks purchased the rights to air seasons 1–3 on their networks. They can be seen primarily on the Bio Channel and the flagship A&E Channel. They can also be seen on A&E's Crime and Investigation Network.

Gangsters featured in series

Leroy "Nicky" Barnes - Harlem heroin dealer and snitch
The Detroit Chambers Brothers - Detroit crack dealing gang
D.C. Snipers (aka Beltway Snipers/John Allen Muhammad/Lee Boyd Malvo)
Larry Davis - New York City suspect in seven murders, known for shootout with police and evading capture for 17 days. With over 2 million viewers tuning in, Season 3 Episode 1 "Larry Davis" was the highest rated episode in BET history.
Mac Dre & The Romper Room Gang - rapper with ties to robbery gang
Rayful Edmond - Washington D.C. crack dealer
Guy Fisher - Harlem heroin dealer and former partner of Leroy "Nicky" Barnes
Jeff Fort - co-founder of the Black P. Stones gang. Convicted in 1987 of conspiring with Libya to perform acts of domestic terrorism
Larry Hoover - leader of the Gangster Disciples
Cornell Jones - Washington D.C. cocaine dealer
Luis Felipe - Founder of the Bloodline Latin Kings in New York.
Willie Lloyd - Leader of the Vice Lords
Sean Lorenzo - OG Washington D.C. - Filmmaker/Rap Artist
Frank Lucas - Harlem heroin dealer
Kenneth "Supreme" McGriff - Queens drug dealer. Leader of The Supreme Team
Felix Mitchell - Oakland drug dealer and leader of 69 Mob
Robert "Midget" Molley - Atlantic City cocaine dealer
Lorenzo "Fat Cat" Nichols - Queens cocaine dealer
Philly Black Mafia - Philadelphia-based organized crime syndicate
Ricky Ross - L.A. crack dealer
"Monster" Kody Scott - infamous member of Eight Tray Gangster Crips and author
Shower Posse - Jamaican posse involved with drug and arms smuggling in Jamaica, New York, New Jersey and Pennsylvania
The Smith Brothers - San Francisco jewellery store robbers
Chaz Williams - Queens bank robber
Melvin Williams - former Baltimore drug trafficker and actor
Stanley "Tookie" Williams - Former leader of the Crips

Cast
Alex A. Alonso ...  Himself (2 episodes, 2006, 2008)
Chico Brown ...  Himself (1 episode, 2006)
Antoine Clark ...  Himself (1 episode, 2006)
Bernard Parks ...  Himself (1 episode, 2006)
Charles Pitchford ...  Himself (1 episode, 2006)
Fred Shaw Jr. ...  Himself (1 episode, 2006)
Maxine Waters ...  Herself (1 episode, 2006)
John W. King ...  Himself (1 episode, 2007)
Sean Lorenzo ... Himself (1 episode 2006)

References

Bibliography
 Independent reviews of all three seasons (26 episodes).

External links
 
 Season 1 biographies - Streetgangs.com

2006 American television series debuts
2000s American documentary television series
Almighty Black P. Stone Nation
BET original programming
Black Mafia
Crips
Latin Kings (gang)
Works about African-American organized crime

pt:American Gangster